Tadeusz Szczurek (born 28 October 1960) is Polish philosophy and security sciences specialist, Doctor of Philosophy, brigadier general of Polish Armed Forces, associate professor and rector-commander of Military University of Technology in Warsaw, Poland.

He graduated from Wyższa Szkoła Oficerska Wojsk Pancernych in Poznań and Military University of Technology in Warsaw (master's degree). He also completed post-graduate studies at National Defence University of Warsaw (pedagogy and crisis management). In 2001 he obtained a Doctor of Philosophy degree in humanities at Faculty of Philosophy and Sociology of Maria Curie-Skłodowska University in Lublin. The title of his PhD thesis is: “Bioethical aspects of war”. In 2013 National Security Faculty of National Defence University awarded him a habilitation in social sciences.

In 2005–2008 he was the Chief of Logistics of the Ministry of National Defense of Poland, in 2008–2012 Deputy Rector of Military University of Technology and in 2012–2016 Deputy Rector for Military Affairs. In 2016 he replaced gen. dyw. Zygmunt Mierczyk as Rector-Commander of the university. In 2017 he was awarded the Order of Polonia Restituta. On 29 November 2018 he was promoted to the brigadier general rank.

References 

1960 births
Living people
Maria Curie-Skłodowska University alumni
Rectors of universities in Poland
Polish generals